General elections were held in the Netherlands on 10 April 1894. The Liberal Union remained the largest party, winning 57 of the 100 seats in the House of Representatives.

Results

By district
  Radical  
  Liberal  
  National  
  Anti-Revolutionary  
  Catholic

Notes

References

General elections in the Netherlands
Netherlands
1894 in the Netherlands
Election and referendum articles with incomplete results